The Warsh recitation or riwāyat Warsh ʿan Nāfiʿ' is a qiraʿah of the Quran in Islam.

Presentation
This qirāʾah or recitation of the Quran (literally "reading") is conducted according to the rules of tajwid, in accordance with the ahruf.

This method is attributed to Warsh, who himself obtained it from his teacher Nafiʽ al-Madani, who was one of the seven readers who transmitted the Ten Readings.

The recitation of Warsh is one of the two major traditions of qirāʾāt.

History
This recitation relates to Imam Warsh (716-813 CE), whose real name is Uthman Ibn Sa‘id al-Qutbi and was born in Egypt.

His nickname Warsh, a milk substance, came from his teacher Nafiʽ al-Madani due to his fair complexion.

He studied his recitation according to Naafiʽ in Medina.

After completing his studies, he returned to Egypt where he became the senior Qāriʾ of the Quran.

In the tenth century, the Muslim scholar Abu Bakr Ibn Mujāhid canonized the seven readings of the Quran, including Warsh ʽan Naafiʽ.

Although having emerged in Egypt, the recitation of Warsh ʽan Naafiʽ has become widespread in North Africa.

In medieval times, it was the main Quranic recitation in Al-Andalus.

The transmission of Warsh ʽan Naafiʽ represents the reciting tradition of Medina.

It is, alongside the  tradition which represents the recitation tradition of Kufa, one of the two main oral transmissions of the Quran in the Muslim world.

Gallery

Warsh recitation with Maghrebi script

Warsh recitation with Kufic script

See also
Hizb Rateb
Salka (Sufism)
Ijazah

References

Warsh
Warsh recitation